Terrence Jones (born June 18, 1966) is a former quarterback in the Canadian Football League (CFL), where he played from 1989 to 1995 for three teams. Jones played college football at Tulane University. He was selected by the San Diego Chargers in the 1989 NFL Draft, but the Chargers wanted him to move to defensive back. so he moved to the CFL to play quarterback.

In 2004, he was an English teacher at Marion Abramson High School in New Orleans.

References

External links
Just Sport Stats
CFLapedia biography
Tulane Green Wave biography

1966 births
Living people
Players of American football from New Orleans
Players of Canadian football from New Orleans
American players of Canadian football
Canadian football quarterbacks
Calgary Stampeders players
Ottawa Rough Riders players
Shreveport Pirates players
Tulane Green Wave football players
American football quarterbacks